Angel is the ninth studio album by The Ohio Players, and the sixth album recorded for Mercury. The band grew from seven to eight members with the addition of Clarence "Chet" Willis on rhythm guitar.

Three singles were released in support of the album: "Body Vibes," "O-H-I-O," and "Merry Go Round."  "O-H-I-O" would prove to be a concert favorite, with the band and crowd chanting in unison the letters.

Track listing
All tracks composed by Billy Beck, James "Diamond" Williams, Marshall Jones, Marvin "Merv" Pierce, Ralph "Pee Wee" Middlebrooks, Clarence Satchell, and Leroy "Sugarfoot" Bonner.
 "Angel" (7:28)
 "Merry-Go-Round" (4:15)
 "Glad to Know You're Mine" (3:49)
 "Don't Fight My Love" (4:13)
 "Body Vibes" (7:10)
 "Can You Still Love Me?" (4:50)
 "O-H-I-O" (3:07)
 "Faith" (5:30)

Personnel
Billy Beck - Grand piano, Fender Rhodes piano, Hohner Clavinet, RMI Electric piano, ARP Odyssey Synthesizer, ARP string ensemble, Hammond B-3 organ, percussion, and vocals
James "Diamond" Williams - drums, congas, cowbells, temple blocks, percussion, and vocals
Marshall "Rock" Jones - electric bass
Marvin "Merv" Pierce - trumpets
Ralph "Pee Wee" Middlebrooks - trumpets
Clarence "Satch" Satchell - flute, alto saxophones, tenor saxophones, percussion, and vocals
Leroy "Sugarfoot" Bonner - guitars and vocals
Clarence "Chet" Willis - rhythm guitar and vocals

Charts

Singles

References

External links
 Angel at Discogs

1977 albums
Ohio Players albums
Mercury Records albums